The Conservatoire Serge Rachmaninoff de Paris (English translation: Sergei Rachmaninoff Conservatory of Paris) is a professional music school in Paris, which conducts its courses in both French and Russian.

The Conservatoire offers individual instruction in voice and in the standard Western classical musical instruments, as well as in the balalaika  and the clarinet in the klezmer and Roma traditions .  For studies in music theory, composition, analysis, music history, or theatre (Stanislavski System), pupils attend classes together in groups.

Prerequisites

The Russian music 
The musical culture has come to Russia from Europe, but little by little started to develop his own way. Theorists Alexander Serov and Vladimir Stassov identified this way of Russian music. A peak of musical culture has reached the top by the creation of The Five (composers) in the 19th century. The modern Russian music critic Viktor Korshikov (the son of the wife of Vitaliy Peskov) thus summed up: «There is not the development of Russian musical culture without the "Stone Guest". It is three operas - Ivan Soussanine", "Ruslan and Ludmila" and the "Stone guest" have created Mussorgsky, Rimsky-Korsakov and Borodin. "Soussanine" is an opera, where the main character is the people, "Ruslan" is the mythical, deeply Russian intrigue, and a "Guest", in which the drama dominates over the softness of the beauty of sound».

These traditions of Russian music, founded and based on the European classical music, have begun to develop musicians of the following generations.

Russian Diaspora 
The Russian revolution of 1917 pushed out of the country a huge amount of its citizens, in the first place of the Russian intelligentsia: the philosophers, writers, musicians, etc.

France was considered at the time to the cultural capital of the world, many Russian emigrants came to Paris. And Paris has been taken!

Russian Diaspora in France has proven to be a great and has had an influence on the whole of the French culture and mixed with it.

The Russian ballet was a huge success, Russian opera companies appeared in Paris featuring Maria Nikolaevna Kuznetsova, Alexey Tsereteli etc.

Russian musical culture became a part of the overall culture of the world, and the Russian musicians in France wanted to keep it. Thus was born the idea of the creation of the Conservatory Russian.

History
The Conservatoire was established between 1923 and 1931 by some of the most illustrious émigré professors from the music schools of Imperial Russia, who included Feodor Chaliapin, Alexander Glazunov, Alexander Gretchaninov, and Sergei Rachmaninoff. Rachmaninoff was the institution's first honorary president and later became its namesake.

The first Director of the Conservatoire, was invited Serge Wolkonsky. Then the directors were elected alternately Nikolai Tcherepnin, composer Pavel Kovalev (1946—1951), composer Arkadj Ougritchitch-Trebinsky (1951—1952), Vladimir Pol etc.

Among the first teachers: Russian musicians Feodor Chaliapin, Nikolai Tcherepnin, Nikolay Kedrov Sr., his wife Sofia Gladkaya (Lila Kedrova's parents), Nikolai Medtner, Alexandra Jacovleva (sister of Alexandre Jacovleff), Yelena Terian-Korganova, Nicolas Zverev, Serge Lifar, Varvara Strakhova, Yuliy Konus, Marya Slavina etc.

In 1931, the newly constituted Société musicale russe de France took over the management of the Conservatoire, with the intention of continuing the work of the Russian Musical Society founded in Saint Petersburg in 1859.

Since 1932, the Conservatoire has regularly hosted concerts by prestigious musicians from across the globe, among them Vladimir Horowitz, Nathan Milstein, Gregor Piatigorsky, and Alexander Borovsky.  Recognized as a public benefit organization (utilité publique) in 1983, the Société musicale russe de France presided by Count Pierre Sheremetev

From 2011, classical pianist Elizabeth Sombart taught at the Conservatoire.

References
Origins of the Conservatoire (in French)

External links
Homepage of the Conservatoire Rachmaninoff (in French)
Exclusive material of the Conservatoire Rachmaninoff (in Russian)

Sergei Rachmaninoff
Music schools in Paris
Educational institutions established in 1931
Russian music
White Russian emigration
Russian diaspora in France
1931 establishments in France